Noordhoek is a 68% white suburb of the city of Bloemfontein in South Africa. The most prominent landmark in the area is the Dutch Reformed Church Noordhoek designed by Gerhard Moerdjik. The business hub is the Spar Naval View.
Then the newly Pick 'n Pay Reizis Square which open there doors on the 28th November 2019 on the corner of Waverley Road and Ramond Mhlaba Street. This is a world class Center with Manager John Pentz and David Garrett running the Pick 'n Pay store. The store is a landmark that build the bridge between poor and rich with the ultimate goal of serving the community. Pick 'n Pay Reizis Square created 85 new Jobs in the area.

References

Suburbs of Bloemfontein